The House of Obolensky is the name of a princely Russian family of the Rurik dynasty. The family of aristocrats mostly fled Russia in 1917 during the Russian Revolution.

History 
Their name is said to derive from the town of Obolensk in the Upper Oka Principalities near Moscow.
The Obolensky coat of arms is composed of the emblems of Kiev and Chernigov.
Cadet branches of the family include  the Repnin, Lykov, Leperovich, Dolgorukov and Shcherbatov families.

Family members include:
Ivan Mikhailovich Obolensky (†1523), nicknamed Repnya, ancestor of the Repnin family
Mikhail Aleksandrovich Obolensky (1821–1886)
Ivan Mikhailovich Obolensky (1853–1910), Governor-General of Finland
Alexander Dimitrievich Obolensky (1847–1917)
Alexei Dmitrievich Obolensky (24 November/6 December 1855-21 September 1933)-Russian state man, equerry, Chief Prosecutor of the Holy Synod(1905—1906), an owner of the Berezichi estate

After the Russian revolution, part of the Obolensky family was forced into exile and their descendants carry "Obolensky" as a regular surname.

 Alexander Sergeevich Obolensky (b. 1916, d. 1940 in Suffolk, was a Russian Prince and went on to represent England in international Rugby Union. He was popularly known as "The Flying Prince" or simply as "Obo"
 Alexis Alekseevich Obolensky (1915–1986), socialite and "father of modern backgammon"
 Alexis Nikolaevich Obolensky (1919-2006), senior U.S. State Department interpreter (nine languages), instrumental in completion of notable US-USSR Treaties and Agreements 
 Arnaud (Lvovich) Henry Salas-Perez Obolensky (b. 1982), son of Lev Obolensky and Chantal Salas-Perez
 Dimitri Alexandrovich Obolensky (1882–1964), son of Prince Alexander Dimitrievich Obolensky (1847–1917), after the revolution became a night watchman and a taxi driver in Paris
 Dimitri Dmitriyevich Obolensky (1918–2001), historian, son of Dmitri Alexandrovich Obolensky (1882–1964) and Countess Maria Shuvalov (1894–1973)
 Ivan Sergeyevich Obolensky (1925–2019), son of Sergei Platonovich "Serge" Obolensky and Ava Alice Muriel Astor
 Lev Sergeevich Obolensky (b. 1926, d. 2010)
 Nikolai Obolensky, Member, Nicholas II's regimental guard; fled Russia to Germany; father of Alexis Nikolaevich Obolensky
 Nicholas Alexandrovich Obolensky (1900–79), married in 1937 Véra Makarov, a heroine of the French Resistance during World War II. * Nikolai Mikhailovich Obolensky (b 1956, Management author, professor, International Leadership expert)
 Serge Obolensky (1890–1978), Sergei Platonovich "Serge" Obolensky (born at Tsarskoye Selo), was a Russian Prince; 1st husband of Ava Alice Muriel Astor (1902—1956) (daughter of John Jacob Astor IV (1864—1912) of the Astor family and Ava Lowle Willing (1868—1958)), and son of Platon Sergeyevich Obolensky and Marie Narishkin, he was Vice Chairman of the Board of Hilton Hotels Corporation. His first wife was a daughter of Emperor Alexander II of Russia
 Sergei Vladimirovich Obolensky (b. 1901, d. 1992 in Basel) 
 Vladimir Andreevich Obolensky (b. 1869, d. 1950 in Bussy-en-Othe)
 Vladimir Sergeevich Obolensky-Randlkofer, (b. 1932, d. 1991 in Basel), son of Sergei Vladimirovich (1901-1992)

 
Russian noble families